China Investment Promotion Agency (CIPA, Chinese: 商务部投资促进事务局) is the investment promotion agency of PR China. It is in charge of inviting in (FDI in China) and going global  (outbound investment). Two-way investment promotion works in line with China's economic strategies and is engaged in cooperation with international economic organizations, foreign investment promotion agencies, chambers of commerce and business associations on behalf of the Ministry of Commerce of the PRC.

MOFCOM
CIPA is part of the Ministry of Commerce of the PRC.

Function
Organizing and implementing the foreign investment promotion strategy; 
Guiding and involving in the Federation of Investment Promotion Agencies of China; 
Guiding the work of investment promotion agencies of different areas.
Attending the conferences of the World Association of Investment Promotion Agencies (WAIPA) on behalf of the Ministry of Commerce; 
Engaging in cooperation and communications with the relevant international economic organizations, foreign investment promotion agencies, chambers of commerce and business associations; 
Organizing and implementing activities of bilateral and multilateral investment promotion agencies.
Implementing the annual investment promotion programs of Ministry of Commerce; 
Carrying out the detailed organizing work for China International Fair of Investment & Trade hosted by Ministry of Commerce; 
Carrying out topic research related to investment; 
Editing and printing publicized materials and relevant investment promotion publications; 
Being in charge of the daily operation of the website of "Invest in China"; 
Offering relevant investment information for domestic and international enterprises; 
Accepting and handling complaints from foreign investment enterprises of trans-provinces, trans-cities, trans-regions and trans-industries.
Planning and organizing large investment promotion activities at home and abroad, organizing relevant investment activities such as training, forum, conference and exhibition; 
Operating website of "Invest in China", and implementing net connection with investment promotion agencies both at home and abroad, finance bodies and commerce bodies; 
Carrying out business cooperation for commercialization and specialization of investment promotion; 
Dealing with consultation, information service, market investigation, credit investigation related to investment activities and planning services on investment promotion; 
Assisting foreign investment enterprises for relevant legal procedures.

Structure
 General Office of China International Fair for Investment and Trade (CIFIT)
 Investment Promotion Planning and Service Center
 Foreign Investment Cooperation Department
 Training Department
 Special Projects Development Department
 Liaison Department
 Information Consulting Department
 Conferences and Fairs Department
 Business Development Department
 Survey and Research Department
 Financial Department
 Administrative Department

Sub-national agencies

Anhui Provincial Foreign Investment Promotion Center (AIPC)
 Beijing International Investment Promotion Council
 Xiamen International Investment Promotion Center
 Chongqing Promotion and Service Center for Foreign Investment
 Dongguan Foreign Investment Promotion Center
 Fujian Foreign Investment Service Center
Guangzhou Municipal Board for International Investment
 Harbin Economic Cooperation and Promotion Bureau
 Jilin Provincial Foreign Investment Information Network
 Liaoning International Investment Promotion Center
 Ningbo Foreign Investment Promotion Center
 Shanghai Foreign Investment Development Board (FID)
 Shanghai Foreign Investment Service Center
 Shenzhen Municipal Foreign Investment Bureau

See also
China Council for the Promotion of International Trade

References

General Introduction to CIPA

Further reading
China Investment Promotion Agency (Cipa) Partners With Thomson Reuters

External links
Investment Promotion Agency official site
FDI.gov.cn
The Investment Association of China

Investment in China
Investment promotion agencies
Government agencies of China